Žitenice is a municipality and village in Litoměřice District in the Ústí nad Labem Region of the Czech Republic. It has about 1,600 inhabitants.

Administrative parts
Villages of Pohořany and Skalice are administrative parts of Žitenice.

References

Villages in Litoměřice District